The Copa do Atlântico was a football club competition held in 1956, also known as Copa Libertadores 1956. It was played in parallel to the 1956 Taça do Atlântico ("Copa del Atlántico" in Spanish), in which the national teams of Argentina, Brazil and Uruguay participated.

The competition was organised by three bodies, Argentine, Brazilian and Uruguayan Football Associations, with five teams from each associations taking part of the tournament. The Copa do Atlântico, along with South American Championship of Champions and Copa Aldao, was one of the predecessors of Copa Libertadores, which would be held for the first time in 1960.

Qualified teams

Tournament

First stage 

 Fluminense by drawing directly joined in the second stage.
 The contest between Danubio e Corinthians was defined in penalties with Corinthians won 4x2.

Quarterfinals

Semifinals

Finals 
Three matches series, two never played, but one final was played, with Corinthians winning Boca Juniors by 3x2: 

Notes

Bracket

Top goalscorers

References 

Atl
Defunct international club association football competitions in South America